The Smallwood Reservoir is the reservoir created for the Churchill Falls Generating Station in the western part of Labrador, Canada. Unlike other reservoirs, water is contained not by a single large dam, but by a series of 88 dikes that total  in length in the drainage area of the Churchill River. It is named in honour of Joey Smallwood, the first premier of Newfoundland.

History 
The earliest evaluation of hydro potential of this vast reservoir was in 1942  when H.G. Acres Company carried out a study for the Aluminum Company of Canada (Alcan). Due to the remoteness of the site then, it was considered too expensive to build and deemed not viable.

With the development of technologies for transmission of electricity over long distances the project design to build the power development including the main dam and control structure and the many dykes began in July 1967 by Acres Canadian Bechtel of Churchill Falls, a joint venture formed by Canadian Bechtel and Acres Engineering, as part of the construction of the Churchill Falls Generating Station.

Geography 
Before construction it was inundated with many bogs and small interconnected lakes. The three largest of these lakes were Ossokmanuan, Lobstick and Michikamau. Ossokmanuan became a reservoir for the Twin Falls power station.

The area was mostly drained by the Churchill River. At the edge of the plateau it dropped  before the falls, a further  at the falls and a further  through the Bowdoin Canyon. It was named after Bowdoin College in Maine which sponsored an expedition in 1891 to visit the falls.

Construction 

The reservoir requires 88 dykes to prevent overflow outside of the reservoir. The two reservoirs require three control structures to regulate flow. The Gabbro Control Structure which regulated the Ossokmanuan reservoir, the Lobstick Control Structure that regulates the Smallwood reservoir and the Whitefish Control Structure for the forebay reservoirs. Both forebays are further regulated by spillways to prevent flooding.

The project took 9 years to complete from 1966 to 1974, with peak construction in 1970 when a total of 6,245 workers were stationed at the main camp and eleven satellite camps. The project was completed five months ahead of schedule.

See also
Churchill Falls

References

Labrador
Lakes of Newfoundland and Labrador
Reservoirs in Canada
Churchill Falls